Coode Island is a former island at the convergence of the Yarra and Maribyrnong Rivers, 4 km west of central Melbourne, Australia. The island was formed by the excavation of the Coode Canal in 1887, and became connected to the mainland in the 1930s. Today the low-lying land is part of the Port of Melbourne, and is used as the site of Swanson and Appleton Docks and their associated container storage and rail yards, as well as a number of chemical storage facilities.

History

Before the 1880s, the area of Coode Island was an expansive low-lying wetland. The island became isolated from the mainland after the Coode Canal was dug to shorten the length of the Yarra River in 1886. A shipping canal was constructed to the south of the existing course of the river through Fishermans Bend, to allow access from the Port of Melbourne to Yarraville.  The boundaries were the canal on the south, the Maribyrnong River on the west and the Yarra River on the north and east. Once formed, the island became an industrial area of 97 hectares. The island was named after Sir John Coode, an English harbour engineer who was engaged by the Melbourne Harbor Trust to select the optimum route for the canal as part of the Port of Melbourne. The former course of the Yarra River was slowly filled in over the years, along with the associated swamps, and by the mid-twentieth century, Coode Island was no longer a true island, although the name remained.

By 1909 the area was being used as an animal quarantine station and after 1915 as a sanatorium for victims of bubonic plague and other contagious diseases. By the 1920s the area was inhabited by hermits living in huts and abandoned ships. In 1927 the Larkin Aircraft Supply Company had set up operations on the island, including a factory and aerodrome, which was used until World War II.

In 1960 the area began being used for the storage of petrochemicals. In 1968 the Swanson Dock container terminal was constructed on the south side of the former island, which reduced the size of Coode Island.

On 21 August 1991, at the Anchor Tank facility, St. Elmo's fire ignited one of the storage tanks, resulting in the Coode Island explosion. About 8.5 million litres of organic compounds burned including acrylonitrile and benzene, creating a toxic cloud over nearby residential suburbs, which was dispersed by strong winds.  The ignition spread between tanks through a common vent system, nitrogen blanketing had been considered unnecessary when the tanks were designed, and the common vent system was installed as a later modification to allow recovery of fumes for environmental purposes.

Proposals were made to move the facility to Point Lillias near Geelong, but environmental and Aboriginal heritage concerns thwarted the plans. In 2000 the Bracks Government announced that Coode Island would be the site of Victoria's major petrochemical storage facility, with six companies leasing the facility from the Melbourne Port Authority.

See also
Coode Canal
Port of Melbourne
West Melbourne, Victoria
Yarra River

References

Islands of Victoria (Australia)
Explosions in Australia
River islands of Australia
Yarra River
Industrial fires and explosions in Australia
1991 in Australia
1991 fires in Oceania
1991 industrial disasters
Port of Melbourne
Maribyrnong River